Termitolinus is a genus of Aleocharinae, a subfamily of rove beetle, in the tribe Termitopaediini.

References

Aleocharinae genera
Aleocharinae